= Vehicle registration plates of Togo =

Togolese Republic
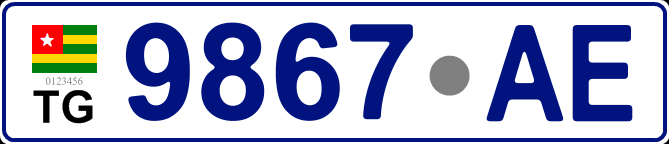
- Regular license plate from Togo.
- Country: Togo
- Country code: TG

Current series
- Size: 520 mm × 110 mm 20.5 in × 4.3 in
- Serial format: 1234-AB
- Colour (front): Black on white
- Colour (rear): Black on white

The vehicle registration plates of Togo is a legal form requiring the citizens of Togo to have the car registered.

== Regular license plates ==
The number plates of Togo have a European shape and size. There are one-line and two-way license plates. The current scheme of regular license plates for private transport of Togo was introduced in 2007. It has a format 1234-AB, where 1234 is the number, AB is the series. Regular plates have a white background with dark blue or black signs. On the left side of the plate is an image of the flag of the country under which the TG code is located. There is a two-line version of such license plates in the format AB / 1234. There is no regional coding.

== Other formats ==
=== Commercial vehicles ===
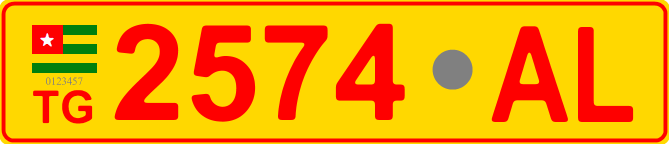
Commercial license plate

Commercial vehicles have license plates with red characters on a yellow background. The license plate format is similar to the regular. On the left side of the plate is an image of the flag of the country under which the TG code is located.

=== State transport ===
Government vehicles license plate format is G / A 1234, where G is the Government Index, A is the series, and 1234 is the number. These plates have a light green background and white symbols. On the left side of the plate is an image of the flag of the country under which the TG code is located.

=== Diplomatic number plates ===
Diplomatic license plates have white characters on a blue background and 12CD34 format, where 12 is the country code, CD is a sign of diplomatic staff, and 34 is the number. On the left side of the plate is an image of the flag of the country under which the TG code is located.
